Born 4 is the second album from Canadian group Jakalope. It was released in Japan on June 7, and was released on October 3 in Canada. The first single from the album, "Upside Down (And I Fall)", was released with an accompanying video. It was noted that the video had left behind the theme of cloning that was used in the videos from It Dreams. The second single from the album is "Digging Deep", the video for which apparently returned to the themes of its predecessors from It Dreams.

Trent Reznor co-produces, and the album includes guests such as Allie Sheldan (Rio Bent), Thom D'arcy of Small Sins, Bob Pantella (Monster Magnet), Alex Lifeson (Rush), Jeremy Fisher and Bill Rieflin (Ministry, R.E.M., Married to Music).

Track listing
 "Anthem 2" – 2:37
 "Instigator" – 3:55
 "Upside Down" – 3:39
 "Throw It Away" – 3:03
 "Code 4 Love" – 3:03
 "Forecast 42" – 3:07
 "Intervention" – 3:36
 "Digging Deep" – 3:22
 "Star 24 (No Apologies)" – 3:00
 "Get It Back" – 3:12
 "Unsaid" (duet with Jeremy Fisher) – 3:23
 "Something New" – 3:10
 "Buried" (Japanese bonus track) – 5:05
 "Pretty Life" (The Respirator Remix) (Japanese bonus track) – 6:31

References

2006 albums
Jakalope albums